The Half Way House is a historic shelter for shipwrecked mariners on Andrew Harding Lane in Chatham, Massachusetts.  This small shed-like structure was probably built in the late 19th century, and originally stood opposite the Old Harbor U.S. Life Saving Station.  It may have been one of a number of such shelters erected by the Massachusetts Humane Society to provide protection for shipwrecked mariners, and is probably the last of its type.  It was blown down in a 1944 hurricane, and moved to a location on private property off Andrew Harding Lane.

The building was listed on the National Register of Historic Places in 1978.  Massachusetts Historic Commission Records indicate the building was demolished in 1991.

See also
National Register of Historic Places listings in Barnstable County, Massachusetts

References

External links
Halfway House, at U.S. Coast Guard, includes photos

1920 establishments in Massachusetts
1991 disestablishments in Massachusetts
Buildings and structures completed in 1920
Buildings and structures demolished in 1991
Buildings and structures in Barnstable County, Massachusetts
Chatham, Massachusetts
Demolished buildings and structures in Massachusetts
National Register of Historic Places in Barnstable County, Massachusetts